The cuneonavicular joint is a joint (articulation) in the human foot. It is formed between the navicular bone and the three cuneiform bones. The navicular and cuneiform bones are connected by dorsal and plantar ligaments.

Dorsal ligaments
The dorsal ligaments are three small bundles, one attached to each of the cuneiform bones.

The bundle connecting the navicular with the medial cuneiform bone is continuous around the medial side of the articulation with the plantar ligament which unites these two bones.

Plantar ligaments
The plantar ligaments have a similar arrangement to the dorsal, and are strengthened by slips from the tendon of the tibialis posterior.

Synovial membrane
The synovial membrane of these joints is part of the great tarsal synovial membrane.

Movements
Mere gliding movements are permitted between the navicular and cuneiform bones.

References
 Stop Accessory Navicular Pain

Lower limb anatomy
Joints